Sylvain Duclos (born 22 November 1978) is a French snowboarder. He competed in the men's snowboard cross event at the 2006 Winter Olympics.

References

External links
 

1978 births
Living people
French male snowboarders
Olympic snowboarders of France
Snowboarders at the 2006 Winter Olympics
People from Thonon-les-Bains
Sportspeople from Haute-Savoie
21st-century French people